Dimitrios Dimaras (1869–1926) was a Greek army general.

He was born at Nafplio in 1869. He entered the Hellenic Army Academy, graduating as a second lieutenant of engineers in 1892. 

He participated in the Greco-Turkish War of 1897 and the two Balkan Wars of 1912–1913. He retired in November 1919, but was recalled to service in 1920, and appointed division commander in the Asia Minor front. He was taken prisoner during the Battle of Dumlupınar and not repatriated to Greece until a prisoner exchange in 1923.

He was dismissed from service on 12 November 1923 with the rank of major general, and died on 5 March 1926.

References

1869 births
1926 deaths
Greek military personnel of the Balkan Wars
Greek military personnel of the Greco-Turkish War (1897)
Greek military personnel of the Greco-Turkish War (1919–1922)
Hellenic Army major generals
People from Nafplion
Greek prisoners of war
Prisoners and detainees of Turkey